Curtis Sanford (born October 5, 1979) is a Canadian former professional ice hockey goaltender who last played for Lokomotiv Yaroslavl of the Kontinental Hockey League (KHL). He is currently a goalie coach for the Toronto Maple Leafs. He previously played in the National Hockey League (NHL) with the St. Louis Blues, Vancouver Canucks, and Columbus Blue Jackets.

Playing career
Sanford played junior hockey for the Wiarton Wolves of the Western Junior C Hockey League, the Collingwood Blues of the Ontario Provincial Junior A Hockey League (OPJHL), the Owen Sound Greys of the Midwestern Junior B Hockey League and the Owen Sound Platers of the Ontario Hockey League (OHL) before turning professional.

Undrafted out of junior, Sanford was signed as a free agent by the St. Louis Blues after his final year with the Platers in 2000, and spent his first five seasons in the club's farm system between the Peoria Rivermen of the ECHL and Worcester IceCats of the American Hockey League (AHL). Sanford earned a call-up with the Blues during the 2002–03 season after injuries to goaltenders Fred Brathwaite and Brent Johnson in October. He played in his first game when fellow rookie call-up Reinhard Divis also went down with an injury after the first period on October 17, 2002, against the Columbus Blue Jackets. He made 12 saves in relief in a 7–1 victory for the Blues. Sanford briefly earned the starting position in the absence of the Blues' usual goaltenders before going down with an injury himself, a high-ankle sprain, on October 24 against the Edmonton Oilers. He returned to start in several more games and posted a 5–1 record and a 1.96 GAA in his first stint with the Blues before being returned to Worcester.

In 2005–06, Sanford appeared poised to play backup to the recently acquired Patrick Lalime. However, as Lalime struggled, Sanford seized the starting position and was having a career year until going down with a sprained ACL in his left knee in March. Before missing the remainder of the season, Sanford had a 13–13–5 record with a 2.66 goals against average (GAA) and .908 save percentage. The Blues finished in last place that year. Recovered from his knee injury, Sanford returned the next season and competed with Manny Legace for the starting position. In November, he was sidelined for several games with a groin strain, then re-injured his groin in December, missing an extended period of time. Sanford returned to complete the season but saw his numbers decrease to an 8–12–5 record with a 3.18 GAA and .888 save percentage.

Sanford became an unrestricted free agent in the off-season and on July 3, 2007, the Vancouver Canucks signed him to a one-year, $600,000 contract to back-up starting goaltender Roberto Luongo. He appeared in 16 games in the 2007–08 season, filling in for Luongo mostly in light of his rib injury in December. Posting a 2.83 GAA, he was re-signed to another one-year contract worth $650,000 by the Canucks on July 3, 2008.

Before the start of the 2008–09 season, Sanford and the Canucks held a contest challenging fans to submit artwork for a new mask design. This was to go along with his new nickname of "The Big C.S." Sanford's nickname, "the Sandman", inspired his previous mask designs. After Luongo suffered a groin injury in late November, Sanford assumed the starting position. However, Sanford himself became prone to injury and suffered back spasms in a game against the Columbus Blue Jackets on December 1, 2008, before being placed on injured reserve with a groin injury on December 30. With the subsequent acquisition of Jason LaBarbera and the imminent return of Luongo, Sanford was placed on waivers by the Canucks on January 14, 2009. Clearing waivers, he was assigned to the Manitoba Moose of the AHL, where he completed the season.

In the off-season, Sanford signed a one-year, two-way contract with the Montreal Canadiens on July 20, 2009, for the 2009–10 season. With both Jaroslav Halák and Carey Price minding net, Sanford was assigned to the Canadiens' AHL affiliate, the Hamilton Bulldogs. After a successful season with the Bulldogs, he signed a one-year extension.

Sanford signed a one-year contract and spent the 2011–12 season with the Columbus Blue Jackets, appearing in 36 games. Following the season, he agreed to terms on a contract with Kontinental Hockey League (KHL) team Lokomotiv Yaroslavl; Lokomotiv were still rebuilding after losing its entire team in the 2011 Lokomotiv Yaroslavl plane crash.

At the conclusion of his third season with Lokomotiv, Sanford announced his retirement from professional hockey on March 7, 2015.

On July 5th, 2022, it was announced that Sanford would be joining the Toronto Maple Leafs as a goaltending coach.

Career statistics

Awards and honours

References

External links

1979 births
Living people
Canadian ice hockey goaltenders
Columbus Blue Jackets players
Hamilton Bulldogs (AHL) players
Sportspeople from Owen Sound
Lokomotiv Yaroslavl players
Manitoba Moose players
Missouri River Otters players
Owen Sound Platers players
Peoria Rivermen (AHL) players
Peoria Rivermen (ECHL) players
Rochester Americans players
St. Louis Blues players
Undrafted National Hockey League players
Vancouver Canucks players
Worcester IceCats players
Ice hockey people from Ontario
Canadian expatriate ice hockey players in Russia
Toronto Maple Leafs coaches